Seven Paths is an unincorporated community in southeastern Franklin County, North Carolina, United States.

It is located at the intersection of Seven Paths Road (SR 1002) and Sykes Road (SR 1629, SR 1636), northeast of Bunn, at an elevation of 312 feet (95 m).

References

Unincorporated communities in Franklin County, North Carolina
Unincorporated communities in North Carolina